Christine Laprell (6 May 1950 – 11 May 2021) was a German alpine skier who competed in the 1968 Winter Olympics. She was born in Munich, Bavaria, Germany.

Olympic events 
1968 Winter Olympics, competing for West Germany:
 Women's downhill – 24th place
 Women's giant slalom – 15th place
 Women's slalom – 10th place

References 

1950 births
2021 deaths
German female alpine skiers
Alpine skiers at the 1968 Winter Olympics
Olympic alpine skiers of West Germany
Skiers from Munich
20th-century German women